Michael Chertoff (born November 28, 1953) is an American attorney who was the second United States Secretary of Homeland Security to serve under President George W. Bush. Chertoff also served for one additional day under President Barack Obama. He was the co-author of the USA PATRIOT Act. Chertoff previously served as a United States circuit judge of the United States Court of Appeals for the Third Circuit, as a federal prosecutor, and as Assistant U.S. Attorney General. He succeeded Tom Ridge as U.S. Secretary of Homeland Security on February 15, 2005.

Since leaving government service, Chertoff has worked as senior of counsel at the Washington, D.C. law firm of Covington & Burling. He also co-founded the Chertoff Group, a risk-management and security consulting company. He is also the Chair and a member of the board of trustees in the international freedom watchdog Freedom House. Chertoff also sits on the bipartisan advisory board of States United Democracy Center.

Early life and education
Michael Chertoff was born on November 28, 1953, in Elizabeth, New Jersey. His father was Rabbi Gershon Baruch Chertoff (1915–96), a Talmud scholar and the former leader of the Congregation B'nai Israel in Elizabeth. His mother was Livia Chertoff (née Eisen), she was a naturalized American citizen after having held status under a British mandate and was the first flight attendant for El Al. His paternal grandparents are Rabbi Paul Chertoff and Esther Barish Chertoff.

Chertoff attended the Jewish Educational Center in Elizabeth as well as the Pingry School. He graduated from Harvard College with a Bachelor of Arts degree in 1975. During his sophomore year, he studied abroad at the London School of Economics and Political Science. He then attended Harvard Law School, where he worked as a research assistant for John Hart Ely on his book Democracy and Distrust. Chertoff received a Juris Doctor, magna cum laude, in 1978.

Career
Following his law school graduation, Chertoff served as a law clerk to Judge Murray Gurfein of the United States Court of Appeals for the Second Circuit and later for United States Supreme Court Justice William J. Brennan, Jr. from 1979 to 1980.

Chertoff worked in private practice with Latham & Watkins from 1980 to 1983 before being hired as a prosecutor by Rudolph Giuliani, then the United States Attorney for the Southern District of New York. Chertoff worked on Mafia and political corruption–related cases. In the mid-1990s, Chertoff returned to Latham & Watkins for a brief period, founding the firm's office in Newark, New Jersey.

In September 1986, together with United States Attorney for the Southern District of New York Rudolph Giuliani, Chertoff was instrumental in the crackdown on organized crime in the Mafia Commission Trial.

In 1990, Chertoff was appointed by President George H. W. Bush as United States Attorney for the District of New Jersey. Among his most important cases, in 1992 Chertoff achieved conviction of second-term Jersey City mayor Gerald McCann on charges of defrauding money from a savings and loan scam. McCann served two years in federal prison.

In 1993, he was a prosecutor in the fraud case against Eddie Antar, founder of the Crazy Eddie electronics store chain.

Chertoff was asked to stay in his position when the Clinton administration took office in 1993, at the request of Democratic Senator Bill Bradley. He was the only United States Attorney who was not replaced due to the change in administrations. He continued to work with the U.S. Attorney's office until 1994, when he entered private practice, returning to Latham & Watkins as a partner.

Despite his friendly relationship with some Democrats, Chertoff was appointed as the special counsel for the Senate Whitewater Committee studying allegations against President Clinton and his wife in what was known as the Whitewater investigation. No charges were brought against the Clintons.

In 2000, Chertoff worked as special counsel to the New Jersey Senate Judiciary Committee, investigating racial profiling in New Jersey. He also did some fundraising for George W. Bush and other Republicans during the 2000 election cycle. He advised Bush's presidential campaign on criminal justice issues. 

Chertoff was appointed by Bush to head the criminal division of the Department of Justice, serving from 2001 to 2003. He led the federal prosecution's case against suspected terrorist Zacarias Moussaoui. In 2002 and 2003, Chertoff provided legal advice to the CIA on the use of coercive interrogation methods against terror suspects such as Abu Zubaydah.

Chertoff also led the prosecution's case against accounting firm Arthur Andersen for destroying documents relating to the Enron collapse. The prosecution of Arthur Andersen was controversial, as the firm was effectively dissolved, resulting in the loss of 26,000 jobs. The United States Supreme Court overturned the conviction, and the case has not been retried.

Federal judgeship
On March 5, 2003, Chertoff was nominated by President Bush to a seat on the United States Court of Appeals for the Third Circuit vacated by Morton I. Greenberg. He was confirmed by the Senate 88–1 on June 9, 2003, with Senator Hillary Clinton of New York casting the lone dissenting vote; he received his commission the following day. Senator Clinton said that she had dissented to register her protest for the way Chertoff's staff mistreated junior White House staffers during the Whitewater investigation. Chertoff served as a federal judge from 2003 to 2005.

Secretary of Homeland Security

In late 2004, Bernard Kerik was forced to decline President Bush's offer to replace Tom Ridge, the outgoing Secretary of Homeland Security. After a lengthy search to find a suitable replacement, Bush nominated Chertoff to the post in January 2005, citing his experience with post-9/11 terror legislation. He was unanimously approved for the position by the United States Senate on February 15, 2005.

Hurricane Katrina occurred while Chertoff was Secretary of Homeland Security. The Department was criticized for its lack of preparation in advance of the well-forecast hurricane; most criticism was directed toward the Federal Emergency Management Agency. DHS in general, and Chertoff in particular, were criticized for responding poorly to the disaster, ignoring crucial information about the catastrophic nature of the storm and devoting little attention to the federal response to what became the most costly disaster in American history.

Chertoff was the Bush administration's point man for pushing the comprehensive immigration reform bill, a measure that stalled in the Senate in June 2007.

Chertoff was asked by the Obama administration to stay in his post until 9 a.m. on January 21, 2009, (one day after President Obama's inauguration) "to ensure a smooth transition".

Construction of border fence
Under Chertoff's leadership, the Department of Homeland Security constructed hundreds of miles of fencing along the border between the United States and Mexico. On April 8, 2008, Chertoff issued waivers allowing the Department of Homeland Security to "bypass environmental reviews to speed construction of fencing along the Mexican border". The New York Times reported that pursuant to the Secure Fence Act of 2006, "the department was authorized to build up to 700 miles of fencing along the 2,000-mile Southwest border, where most illegal immigrants cross". Congress had granted Chertoff waiver authority in 2005, but the Times described his actions as an expansion of his waiver authority. According to Times columnist Adam Liptak, Chertoff's action excluded the Department of Homeland Security from having to follow laws "protecting the environment, endangered species, migratory birds, the bald eagle, antiquities, farms, deserts, forests, Native American graves and religious freedom." In an editorial, the Times criticized Chertoff for his use of waiver authority, stating: "To the long list of things the Bush administration is willing to trash in its rush to appease immigration hard-liners, you can now add dozens of important environmental laws and hundreds of thousands of acres of fragile habitat on the southern border."

A report issued by the Congressional Research Service, the non-partisan research division of the Library of Congress, said that the unchecked delegation of powers to Chertoff was unprecedented:

After a review of federal law, primarily through electronic database searches and consultations with various CRS experts, we were unable to locate a waiver provision identical to that of §102 of H.R. 418—i.e., a provision that contains 'notwithstanding' language, provides a secretary of an executive agency the authority to waive all laws such secretary determines necessary, and directs the secretary to waive such laws.

On June 23, 2008, the Supreme Court of the United States declined to hear a constitutional challenge to the 2005 law that gave Chertoff waiver authority.

Actions regarding illegal immigration
In September 2007, Chertoff told a House committee that the DHS would not tolerate interference by sanctuary cities that would block the "Basic Pilot Program," which requires some types of employers to validate the legal status of their workers.

In 2008 it was reported that the residential housekeeping company Chertoff had hired to clean his house employed undocumented immigrants.

Post-DHS career
Since leaving government service, Chertoff has worked as senior of counsel at the Washington, D.C. law firm of Covington & Burling.

He formed The Chertoff Group (TCG) on February 2, 2009, to work on crisis and risk management. The firm is also led by Chad Sweet; he served as the Chief of Staff of Homeland Security while Chertoff was Secretary and also had a two-year stint at the Directorate of Operations for the CIA. The firm also employs Charles E. Allen, Larry Castro, Jay M. Cohen, General Michael V. Hayden and other former high-ranking government employees and appointees.

Chertoff was also elected as Chairman of BAE Systems for a three-year term, beginning May 1, 2012. Chertoff co-chairs the Bipartisan Policy Center's Immigration Task Force.

Chertoff was part of a legal team that represented Russian/Ukrainian Dmitro Firtash's against extradition to the United States.

Chertoff is also a member of the Atlantic Council's board of directors.

From 2017 to 2019, Chertoff served as a member of the Global Commission on the Stability of Cyberspace and was made a co-chair of the commission in its final year.

In a July 2020 op-ed in The New York Times, Chertoff claimed the Trump administration was hijacking the DHS for political purposes.

Views

Globalization
At the Global Creative Leadership Summit in 2009, Chertoff described globalization as a double-edged sword. Although globalization may help raise the standard of living for people around the world, Chertoff claimed that it can also enable terrorists and transnational criminals.

Body scanners
Chertoff has been an advocate of enhanced technologies, such as full body scanners. His consulting firm Chertoff Group (founded 2009) represented manufacturers of the scanners.

Climate change
Chertoff co-signed the preface to the report "National Security and the Accelerating Risks of Climate Change" published in 2014 where he stated that "projected climate change is a complex multi-decade challenge. Without action to build resilience, it will increase security risks over much of the planet. It will not only increase threats to developing nations in resource-challenged parts of the world, but it will also test the security of nations with robust capability, including significant elements of our National Power here at home."

Political endorsements
In the 2016 presidential election, Chertoff endorsed Hillary Clinton.

See also 
 List of law clerks of the Supreme Court of the United States (Seat 3)

References

External links

 

|-

|-

|-

1953 births
21st-century American judges
21st-century American politicians
American people of Russian-Jewish descent
Assistant United States Attorneys
Atlantic Council
George W. Bush administration cabinet members
Obama administration cabinet members
Harvard College alumni
Harvard Law School alumni
Jewish American members of the Cabinet of the United States
Judges of the United States Court of Appeals for the Third Circuit
Law clerks of the Supreme Court of the United States
Living people
New Jersey Republicans
New York (state) lawyers
Politicians from Elizabeth, New Jersey
People associated with Covington & Burling
People associated with Latham & Watkins
People from Potomac, Maryland
People from Westfield, New Jersey
Pingry School alumni
United States Assistant Attorneys General for the Criminal Division
United States Attorneys for the District of New Jersey
United States court of appeals judges appointed by George W. Bush
United States Secretaries of Homeland Security
United States Senate lawyers
Whitewater controversy
Commissioners of the Global Commission on the Stability of Cyberspace